William Kennedy (July 31, 1768 – October 11, 1834) was a member of the United States House of Representatives from North Carolina. He was born near Washington, North Carolina. He graduated from the University of Pennsylvania at Philadelphia in 1782.

Kennedy was elected as a Democratic-Republican to the Eighth United States Congress in 1802, serving from 1803 to 1805.

He was again elected to Congress in 1808, serving in the Eleventh United States Congress.  Kennedy's re-election bid was defeated by Thomas Blount in 1810, though Kennedy was subsequently elected in a special election to fill the vacancy caused by Blount's death.  He served the remainder of the term in the Twelfth United States Congress, and in 1812 won re-election for the Thirteenth United States Congress.

Kennedy died in Washington, North Carolina in 1834.  He is interred in Kennedy Cemetery, near Washington, NC.

Sources
 Biographical entry from the US Congress

1768 births
1834 deaths
Democratic-Republican Party members of the United States House of Representatives from North Carolina
People from Washington, North Carolina